Tsunami is a 2020 Sri Lankan Sinhala disaster drama film directed by Somaratne Dissanayake and produced by his wife Renuka Balasooriya for Cine Films Lanka. It stars Niranjani Shanmugaraja and Darshan Dharmaraj in lead roles along with Himali Sayurangi and Bimal Jayakody. Music composed by Rohana Weerasinghe. The film is based on incidents occurred in Sri Lanka during 2004 Indian Ocean earthquake and tsunami on 26 December 2004.

The screening halted due to COVID-19 pandemic in Sri Lanka. In October 2020, the film has qualified to represent the competition section of the Byelsa International Film Festival in Yonago, Nigeria, in which later won the Best Actress Award as well as Best Director Award. Dissanayake won the Best Director award at the Moonwhite Films International Film Fest in the Feature Film International category at the Moonwhite Films International Film Fest held on 8 December 2020 in India. In addition, the film was nominated for Best International Film.

Plot

The film is based on a true story about a war of love for a mother and a devoted mother who lost a child in the tsunami.

Cast
 Niranjani Shanmugaraja as Kuchchaveli Kalyani	
 Darshan Dharmaraj as Selvam
 Menara Weeratunga as Prabha 
 Himali Sayurangi as Sriyani
 Bimal Jayakody as Kapila
 Giriraj Kaushalya as Lawyer
 Anuruddhika Padukkage as Varuni
 Kumara Thirimadura as Thovilakaru
 Sarath Chandrasiri as Gurunnanse
 Lalith Janakantha as Buddhist monk
 Sampath Tennakoon as Sinhala teacher
 Wishwajith Gunasekara
 Ranjani Rajmohan
 J. Yogaraja

Production and release
The film was shot over a period of 50 days. The tsunami wave was created in an abandoned shrimp box at Molagoda, Negombo. It was Ranmihithenna which was used built the scene where the bus was toppled. The big coconut palm trees and palm trees were transported to the scenery.

The film was initially planned to be released in August 2019 in 75 theaters islandwide by Ben Holdings’ Savoy Cinemas (formerly EAP Films and Theaters).

In November, the film was premiered in nine theaters with state-of-the-art equipment, which were opened recently at Galle face Shopping complex in Colombo one. The film was initially planned to screen on 26 December 2019, it was delayed to the screening of Rush and Vishama Bhaga. The film was officially premiered at Savoy Premier Theater, Wellawatte on 16 January 2020. It is the first Dolby Atmos film in Sri Lanka.

Soundtrack
The film consists with two songs.

References

External links
 
 Tsunami on YouTube
 පීනන්න නොදැන

2020s Sinhala-language films
2020 films